Poor Little Critter on the Road is the debut album from X side project The Knitters, Poor Little Critter on the Road contains original compositions and covers of songs by X as well as established Country music performers.

Track listing
All tracks composed by Exene Cervenka and John Doe; except where indicated
"Poor Little Critter on the Road" – 1:43
"Someone Like You" – 2:40
"Walkin' Cane" (Traditional; arranged by The Knitters) – 5:34
"Silver Wings" (Merle Haggard) – 2:12
"Poor Old Heartsick Me" (Helen Carter) – 2:41
"The New World" – 2:53
"Cryin' But My Tears Are Far Away" – 3:35
"Love Shack" – 3:55
"The Call of the Wreckin' Ball" (John Doe, Dave Alvin) – 2:56
"Trail of Time" (Alton Delmore) – 3:10
"Baby Out of Jail" (Harty Taylor, Karl Davis) – 2:39
"Rock Island Line" (Hudie Ledbetter) – 4:16

Personnel
The Knitters
John Doe – vocals, acoustic guitar
Dave Alvin – acoustic guitar, electric guitar
Exene Cervenka – vocals
D.J. Bonebrake – snare drum
Jonny Ray Bartel – upright bass
Martin Lund – accordion
Billy Zoom – Macaroni box on "Walkin' Cane"

External links
  Allmusic

References

1985 debut albums
The Knitters albums
Slash Records albums